Bullet for a Badman is a 1964 American Western film directed by R. G. Springsteen and starring Audie Murphy and Darren McGavin. The film is based on the 1958 novel Renegade Posse, the working title of the film by Marvin H. Albert. The film was shot between October and November 1963 in Zion National Park and Snow Canyon State Park in Utah.

Plot
Sam Ward and Logan Keliher were once brothers in arms in the Texas Rangers. When both left the force, Ward turned outlaw and is angry at Keliher for marrying his former wife and adopting his child whilst Ward was imprisoned for his crimes. Ward escapes from prison and forms a gang to rob a bank in Keliher's town with Ward planning to kill Keliher after the robbery. Keliher foils the robbery with Ward the only survivor of his gang. Ward escapes with the loot though he is wounded by Keliher. Keliher links up with a posse and uses his knowledge of Ward's ways to track him down.

Once Ward is captured and the bank money recovered, several members of the posse debate whether they should kill Ward and his girlfriend Lottie and keep the bank money for themselves. Their plans are interrupted by an Apache war party.

Cast
 Audie Murphy as Logan Keliher
 Darren McGavin as Sam Ward
 Ruta Lee as Lottie
 Beverley Owen as Susan
 Skip Homeier as Pink
 George Tobias as Diggs
 Alan Hale Jr. as Leach (as Alan Hale)
 Berkeley Harris as Jeff
 Edward Platt as Tucker
 Kevin Tate as Sammy
 Cece Whitney as Goldie
 Mort Mills as Ira Snow
 Ray Teal as the Sweeper
 Bob Steele as the Sheriff (uncredited)
 Aline Towne as the Saloon Girl (uncredited)

Production
Parts of the film were shot at the Virgin River in Zion National Park and Snow Canyon in Utah.

See also
 List of American films of 1964

References

External links
 
 
 
 
 

1964 films
1964 Western (genre) films
American Western (genre) films
Films based on American novels
Universal Pictures films
Audie Murphy
Films shot in Utah
Films scored by Frank Skinner
Films based on Western (genre) novels
1960s English-language films
1960s American films